Arpine "Arpi" Gabrielyan  (born on November 18, 1988), is an Armenian presenter, model, singer and actress. Her debut music video was released in 2015. She is known for her roles as Lika on Full House, Sara on Scotch & Whiskey, Zara on Super Mother.

Personal life
In December 2019, Gabrielyan married singer and actor Mihran Tsarukyan, who was her playmate in Full House. In July 2020, their son Robert was born.

Awards and nominations

Filmography

Discography

Songs
 2010 – "Sere" (Love)
 2014 Dec – "New Year" (featuring with Full House band` Mihran Tsarukyan, Ani Yeranyan, Grigor Danielyan, Gor Hakobyan)
 2015 – "Anhnar e" (It's impossible, featuring Mihran Tsarukyan)
 2015 Dec – "New Year" (featuring with Full House band` Mihran Tsarukyan, Grigor Danielyan, Mardjan Avetisyan, Ani Yeranyan, Gor Hakobyan, Movses Karapetyan)

External links 
 
Page on Armfilm (Russian)

References

1988 births
Living people
Actresses from Yerevan
Musicians from Yerevan
21st-century Armenian women singers
Armenian pop singers
Armenian film actresses
21st-century Armenian actresses
Armenian stage actresses